This is a list of massifs and mountain ranges in Puerto Rico listed alphabetically, and associated landforms.

Cerros de San Francisco (San Francisco Hills)
Cerros de Santini (Santini Hills)
Cordillera Central (Puerto Rico Central mountain range)
Cordillera Jaicoa
Cordillera de Sabana Alta
El Carso Norteño (Puerto Rico Northern karst region)
El Carso Sureño (Puerto Rico Southern karst region)
Montañas Aymamón
Montañas de Corozal (Corozal Mountains)
Montañas de Juan González (Juan González Mountains)
Montañas de Uroyán (Uroyán Mountains)
Montañas Guarionex (Guarionex Mountains)
Sierra Bermeja
Sierra de Cayey
Sierra de Guardarraya
Sierra de Jájome 
Sierra de Luquillo
Sierra de Naranjal

See also 

List of mountain ridges of Puerto Rico
List of Puerto Rico state forests

References

External links
Puerto Rico Guide from Satellite

 
Puerto Rico, List of mountain ranges of
Mountain ranges